Seqenenre Tao (also Seqenera Djehuty-aa or Sekenenra Taa, called 'the Brave') ruled over the last of the local kingdoms of the Theban region of Egypt in the Seventeenth Dynasty during the Second Intermediate Period. He probably was the son and successor to Senakhtenre Ahmose and Queen Tetisheri. The dates of his reign are uncertain, but he may have risen to power in the decade ending in 1560 BC or in 1558 BC (based on the probable accession date of his son, Ahmose I, the first ruler of the Eighteenth Dynasty, see Egyptian chronology). With his queen, Ahhotep I, Seqenenre Tao fathered two pharaohs, Kamose, his immediate successor who was the last pharaoh of the Seventeenth Dynasty, and Ahmose I who, following a regency by his mother, was the first pharaoh of the Eighteenth. Seqenenre Tao is credited with starting the opening moves in a war of revanchism against Hyksos incursions into Egypt, which saw the country completely liberated during the reign of his son Ahmose I.

Reign 
New Kingdom literary tradition states that Seqenenre Tao came into contact with his Hyksos contemporary in the north, Apepi or Apophis. The tradition took the form of a tale, nowadays called "The Quarrel of Apophis and Seqenenre", in which the Hyksos king Apepi sent a messenger to Seqenenre in Thebes to demand that the Theban hippopotamus pool be done away with, for the noise of these beasts was such that he was unable to sleep in far-away Avaris. Perhaps the only historical information that can be gleaned from the tale is that Egypt was a divided land, the area of direct Hyksos control being in the north, but the whole of Egypt paying tribute to the Hyksos kings.

Seqenenre Tao participated in active diplomatic posturing, which went beyond simply exchanging insults with the Asiatic ruler in the North. He seems to have led military skirmishes against the Hyksos and, judging from the vicious head wounds on his mummy in the Egyptian Museum in Cairo, may have died during one of them.

His son and successor Wadjkheperre Kamose, the last ruler of the Seventeenth Dynasty at Thebes, is credited with launching a successful campaign in the Theban war of liberation against the Hyksos, although he is thought to have died in the campaign. His mother, Ahhotep I, is thought to have ruled as regent after the death of Kamose and continued the warfare against the Hyksos until Ahmose I, the second son of Seqenenre Tao and Ahhotep I, was old enough to assume the throne and complete the expulsion of the Hyksos and the unification of Egypt.

Monumental construction

The relatively short length of the reign of Seqenenre Tao did not allow for the construction of many monumental structures, but it is known that he had built a new palace made of mud brick at Deir el-Ballas. On an adjacent hillside overlooking the river, the foundations of a building were found that almost certainly was a military observation post.

A relatively large amount of pottery known as Kerma-ware was found at the site, indicating that a large number of Kerma Nubians were resident at the site. It is thought that they were there as allies of the pharaoh in his wars against the Hyksos.

Mummy

Seqenenre's mummy was discovered in the Deir el-Bahri cache, revealed in 1881. He was interred along with those of later, Eighteenth and Nineteenth Dynasty leaders, Ahmose I (his second son to be pharaoh), Amenhotep I, Thutmose I, Thutmose II, Thutmose III, Ramesses I, Seti I, Ramesses II, and Ramesses IX.

The mummy was unwrapped by Eugène Grébaut when Professor Gaston Maspero resigned his office of directorship on June 5, 1886, and was succeeded in the superintendency of excavations and Egyptian archeology by M. Eugene Grebault. In the same month Grebault started upon the work of unbandaging the mummy of Seqenenre, of the eighteenth dynasty. It was under this monarch that a revolt against the Hyksos had originated, in the course of which the Asiatics were expelled from Egypt. The history of this king had been considered legendary, but from the signs of wounds present in the mummy, it looked likely that he had died in battle. In the same season the mummy of Seti I was unbandaged, and also that of an anonymous prince.

A vivid description provides an account of the injury that was done to the pharaoh at his death:

The wound on his forehead was probably caused by a Hyksos axe and his neck wound was probably caused by a dagger while he was prone. There are no wounds on his arms or hands, which suggests he was not able to defend himself.

Until 2009, the main hypotheses had been that he died either in a battle against the Hyksos or was killed while sleeping. A reconstruction of his death by Egyptologist Garry Shaw and archaeologist and weapons expert Robert Mason suggested a third, which they saw as the likeliest, that Seqenenre was executed by the Hyksos king. Garry Shaw also analysed the arguments for the competing hypotheses and other physical, textual and statistical evidence concluding "that the most likely cause of Seqenenre’s death is ceremonial execution at the hands of an enemy commander, following a Theban defeat on the battlefield."

His mummy appears to have been hastily embalmed. X-rays that were taken of the mummy in the late 1960s show that no attempt had been made to remove the brain or to add linen inside the cranium or eyes, both normal embalming practice for the time. In the opinion of James E. Harris and Kent Weeks, who undertook the forensic examination at the time the X-rays were taken, his mummy is the worst preserved of all the royal mummies held at the Egyptian Museum, and they noted that a "foul, oily smell filled the room the moment the case in which his body was exhibited was opened," which is likely due to the poor embalming process and the absence of the use of absorbing natron salts, leaving some bodily fluids in the mummy at the time of burial. Also, Harris and Weeks noted in 1973 that "his entire facial complex, in fact, is so different from other pharaohs (it is closest in fact to his son Ahmose) that he could be fitted more easily into the series of Nubian and Old Kingdom Giza skulls than into that of later Egyptian kings. Various scholars in the past have proposed a Nubian- that is, non-Egyptian-origin for Sequenre and his family, and his facial features suggest that this might indeed be true." 

In 1980, James Harris and Edward F. Wente conducted another series of X-ray examinations on New Kingdom Pharaoh's crania and skeletal remains, which included the mummified remains of Sequenre Tao. The analysis in general found strong similarities between the New Kingdom rulers of the Seventeenth Dynasty and Eighteenth Dynasty and contemporary Nubians with slight differences.

He was the earliest royal mummy on display in the recently revamped Royal Mummies Hall at the Egyptian Museum, Cairo.

In 2021, a CT scan of his mummy revealed that he died in his forties, possibly on a battlefield, meanwhile his deformed hands imply that he was possibly imprisoned with his hands tied, and his facial fractures correlated well with the Hyksos weapons.

In April 2021 his mummy was moved to National Museum of Egyptian Civilization along with those of 17 other kings and 4 queens in an event termed the Pharaohs' Golden Parade. 

In 2022, biological anthropologist S.O.Y. Keita reviewed studies from various time periods, including the 1973 craniofacial study of Seqenenre Tao which had found affinities with Nubian and Old Kingdom Giza crania. Keita viewed the Giza skulls to be part of a “Nile Valley variation” and commented that it was neither obligatory that those crania series nor King Tao were of Nubian origin, although a “Nubian origin is most certainly possible”. He also stated that it could be inferred “that populations with these traits were ancestral to various later populations”.

References

Further reading
 Gardiner, Sir Alan. Egypt of the Pharaohs. (Oxford, 1964).
 Hayes, William C. Egypt: From the Death of Ammenemes III to Sequenenre II," in Volume 2, Chapter 2 of the "Cambridge Ancient History", Revised Edition (Cambridge, 1965).
 Pritchard, James B. (Editor). Ancient Near Eastern Texts Relating to the Old Testament. Third Edition, with Supplement. (Princeton, 1969).

External links 
 Sequenenre Tao's death and the fate of his mummy, a podcast in the "History of Egypt Podcast" series by Eyptologist Dominic Perry, February 2021

16th-century BC Pharaohs
Pharaohs of the Seventeenth Dynasty of Egypt
Ancient Egyptian mummies
Egyptian Museum
Egyptian rebels
Monarchs killed in action
Axe murder
Deaths by stabbing in Egypt
Ancient rebels